Robert George Gough (born 20 July 1949) is an English former footballer who played as a forward. In a fifteen-year professional career in the English Football League he scored 114 goals in 474 league appearances.

After failing to make an impression at Birmingham City and Walsall, he made his name at Port Vale between 1968 and 1974, making a total of 229 appearances for the "Valiants". During this time he helped the club to win promotion out of the Fourth Division in the 1969–70 season. Following a loan spell at Stockport County, he transferred to Southport in 1974, before arriving at Colchester United two years later. He helped Colchester out of the Fourth Division in 1976–77, and scored a total of 80 goals in 232 games, before he departed for non-league Hendon in 1981. He later turned out for Chelmsford City, before he left football for the building trade.

Career

Early career
Gough was a Birmingham City youth player, but was not offered a professional contract with the club due to his small stature. He then went on to join Third Division Walsall in 1966, but only made one league appearance for the club.

Port Vale
He joined Port Vale in June 1968, who were then in the Fourth Division. He was one of manager Gordon Lee's first signings. He scored his first senior goal on 16 September, in a 3–0 win over York City at Vale Park. He added to his tally with a goal against Exeter City, and also scored in both legs of Vale's FA Cup win over Shrewsbury Town. He finished the 1968–69 campaign with four goals in 42 games.

He was more prolific in the 1969–70 season, scoring nine goals in 45 league games to help the club achieve promotion in fourth place. The most notable of these goals was a 35-yard effort that helped Vale to a 3–2 win at Oldham Athletic on 13 September; The Sentinel reporter Chris Harper noted that "Gough can certainly hit a ball". He coped well in the Third Division, and scored a hat-trick at the Gay Meadow on 12 September, in what finished as a 7–3 defeat for the "Valiants". By the end of the 1970–71 campaign he shot eight goals in 37 games, including a goal against fallen giants Aston Villa. He finished the 1971–72 season as the club's top scorer with ten goals in 47 appearances.

However, in 1972–73 he was limited two goals in 29 games, hitting the net in easy wins over Southend United and Rotherham United. Instead Ray Williams and Sammy Morgan were forming an impressive attacking partnership, scoring 22 goals between them. Gough was dropped in November 1973, and went out on a one-month loan to struggling Fourth Division side Stockport County in December, but failed to score in six appearances. He scored his final goal for the Vale against Southport on 2 March 1974. He finished the 1973–74 campaign with two goals in 26 games for Vale, as well as six games for Stockport County. In May 1974 he was allowed join Southport on a free transfer. He made a total of 229 appearances (210 in the league) and scored 35 goals (33 in the league) for the Vale.

Southport
Southport were starting their 1974–75 campaign in the Fourth Division, having suffered relegation out of the Third Division. The club entered free-fall, and had to apply for re-election at the end of 1975–76, having finished second-from-bottom in the Football League. Gough managed sixteen goals in 61 league appearances for the club in his two seasons, before he joined Colchester United for a £7,000 fee in January 1976.

Colchester United
Bobby Roberts's Colchester United lost their third tier status at the end of 1975–76, despite Gough scoring five goals in 22 games during the second half of the season. Colchester won promotion of the Fourth Division in third-place in 1976–77, with Gough scoring nineteen goals in 52 games – five short of strike partner Colin Garwood. The U's consolidated their Third Division status with an eighth-place finish in 1977–78, and Gough finished as the club's top-scorer with seventeen goals in 51 games. Garwood's tally of thirteen strikes meant the pair combined to bring the U's thirty goals over the course of the campaign.

United went on to finish seventh in 1978–79, and Gough was once again the club's top-scorer with 22 goals in fifty appearances. In the FA Cup, he scored a hat-trick against Oxford United, two against Leatherhead and the winning goal against Newport County to bring Colchester a Fifth Round tie with Manchester United – which the "Red Devils" won 1–0.

Colchester finished fifth in 1979–80, Gough scored twelve goals in 32 games, some six behind strike partner Trevor Lee. The club suffered relegation at the end of the 1980–81 campaign after finishing two points below the safety of Walsall. Gough spent much of the season out of the first team, and made just eighteen appearances, scoring five goals, as Kevin Bremner was preferred to partner Lee up front. Gough left the club for Hendon at the end of the campaign, having scored a total of 80 goals (65 in the league) in 232 games (196 in the league).

Later career
Gough later turned out for non-league sides Hendon (Isthmian League Premier Division) and Chelmsford City.

Post-retirement
After hanging up his boots, Gough worked as a builder in Essex.

Career statistics
Source:

Honours
Port Vale
Football League Fourth Division 4th-place promotion: 1969–70

Colchester United
Football League Fourth Division 3rd-place promotion: 1976–77

References

1949 births
Living people
Footballers from Birmingham, West Midlands
English footballers
Association football forwards
Walsall F.C. players
Port Vale F.C. players
Stockport County F.C. players
Southport F.C. players
Colchester United F.C. players
Hendon F.C. players
Chelmsford City F.C. players
English Football League players
Isthmian League players